The women's 10,000 metres event at the 2007 Summer Universiade was held on 9 August.

Results

References
Results

10000
2007 in women's athletics
2007